The Shadow of Rosalie Byrnes is a 1920 American silent drama film directed by George Archainbaud and starring Elaine Hammerstein, Edward Langford and Alfred Hickman.

Cast
 Elaine Hammerstein as 	Leontine Maddern / Leona Maddern
 Edward Langford as 	Gerald Cromwell
 Anita Booth as Eleanor
 Alfred Hickman as 	Hugo Stone
 Fanny Cogan as	Mrs. Lange
 George Cowl as 	Vasco Lamar 
 Lillian Worth as Mrs. Cromwell
 Juliette Benson as 	Miss Christine

References

Bibliography
 Connelly, Robert B. The Silents: Silent Feature Films, 1910-36, Volume 40, Issue 2. December Press, 1998.
 Munden, Kenneth White. The American Film Institute Catalog of Motion Pictures Produced in the United States, Part 1. University of California Press, 1997.

External links
 

1920 films
1920 drama films
1920s English-language films
American silent feature films
Silent American drama films
American black-and-white films
Films directed by George Archainbaud
Selznick Pictures films
1920s American films
English-language drama films